California Western may refer to:

 California Western Railroad in Fort Bragg, California
 California Western School of Law